Wedgwood Nowell (born Harry Wedgwood Nowell; January 24, 1878 – June 17, 1957) was an American stage and film actor, director, producer, and musician. He produced 144 plays during his stage career, which began around 1901. Later, while working in motion pictures, he performed in at least 140 screen productions between 1915 and the 1940s.

Selected filmography

 The Golden Claw (1915)
 The Chalice of Sorrow (1916)
 Black Orchids (1917)
 The Flower of Doom (1917)
 The Hand That Rocks the Cradle (1917)
 The Mysterious Mr. Tiller (1917)
 The Pulse of Life (1917)
 The Reward of the Faithless (1917)
 The Velvet Hand (1918)
 Adele (1919)
 The Lord Loves the Irish (1919)
 Diane of the Green Van (1919)
 The Man Who Turned White (1919)
 The Man Beneath (1919)
 A Man's Fight (1919)
 Her Purchase Price (1919)
 Kitty Kelly, M.D. (1919)
 The Beauty Market (1919)
 The Corsican Brothers (1920)
 813 (1920)
 The Dream Cheater (1920)
 The Match-Breaker (1921)
 Devotion (1921)
 Thelma (1922)
 Ashes (1922)
 The Song of Life (1922)
 A Doll's House (1922)
 Enter Madame (1922)
 Adam's Rib (1923)
 Don't Marry for Money (1923)
 A Wife's Romance (1923)
 Transatlantic Merry-Go-Round (1934)
 Cleopatra (1934)
 Hell Bent for Love (1934)
 The Big Show (1936)
 Theodora Goes Wild (1936) (uncredited)
 Dick Tracy (1937, Serial)
 Racketeers in Exile (1937)
 Stolen Holiday (1937)
 Calling Philo Vance (1940)
 Affectionately Yours (1941)
 Nazty Nuisance (1943)

Nowell is interred at West Laurel Hill Cemetery, Rockland Section, Plot 188, Bala Cynwyd, PA.

References

External links 

 
 

1878 births
1957 deaths
American male film actors
20th-century American male actors
Place of birth missing